The 2018 Latrobe City Traralgon ATP Challenger was a professional tennis tournament played on outdoor hard court. It was the seventh edition of the tournament which was part of the 2018 ATP Challenger Tour. It took place in Traralgon, Australia between 22–28 October 2018.

Singles main draw entrants

Seeds

 Rankings are as of 15 October 2018.

Other entrants
The following players received wildcards into the singles main draw:
  Harry Bourchier
  Thomas Fancutt
  Jacob Grills
  Aleksandar Vukic

The following players received entry from the qualifying draw:
  Brydan Klein
  Fabien Reboul
  Yosuke Watanuki
  Wu Tung-lin

The following player received entry as a lucky loser:
  Evan Hoyt

Champions

Singles

  Jordan Thompson def.  Yoshihito Nishioka 6–3, 6–4.

Doubles

  Jeremy Beale /  Marc Polmans def.  Max Purcell /  Luke Saville, 6–2, 6–4.

External links
 Official website

Latrobe City Traralgon ATP Challenger
2018 in Australian tennis
2018